Kashabowie/Upper Shebandowan Lake Water Aerodrome  is located on Upper Shebandowan Lake  east of Kashabowie, Thunder Bay District in Northwestern Ontario, Canada.

See also

Kashabowie Outposts Water Aerodrome

References

Registered aerodromes in Ontario
Transport in Thunder Bay District
Seaplane bases in Ontario